Alessandro Armenise (born 23 October 1984 in Pisa) is an Italian footballer. He plays as a defender.

External links
Profile at Lega-Calcio.it

Living people
1984 births
Sportspeople from the Province of Foggia
Italian footballers
S.S. Fidelis Andria 1928 players
S.S. Virtus Lanciano 1924 players
U.S. Catanzaro 1929 players
A.S.D. Martina Calcio 1947 players
S.S.D. Varese Calcio players
A.S. Noicattaro Calcio players
Association football defenders
Footballers from Apulia